The canton of Le Pastel is an administrative division of the Tarn department, southern France. It was created at the French canton reorganisation which came into effect in March 2015. Its seat is in Saïx.

It consists of the following communes:
 
Appelle
Bertre
Blan
Cambounet-sur-le-Sor
Garrevaques
Lempaut
Lescout
Palleville
Poudis
Puylaurens
Saint-Germain-des-Prés
Saint-Sernin-lès-Lavaur
Saïx
Soual
Viviers-lès-Montagnes

References

Cantons of Tarn (department)